Sangaris penrosei is a species of beetle in the family Cerambycidae. It was described by Hovore in 1998. It is known from Panama.

References

penrosei
Beetles described in 1998